In general, Nuclear policy of the United States refers to the policies of the various agencies and departments of the American government at the Federal level with regard to biomedical, energy, emergency response, hazardous waste transport and disposal, military, use of radionuclides including US policy with regard to its participation in international treaties, conventions and organizations. Nuclear policy of the United States may also include management and regulation of nuclear levels in air, food, ground water and other potentially hazardous sources.

 Nuclear energy policy of the United States
 Nuclear Regulatory Commission
 Nuclear weapons and the United States
 Office of Nuclear Reactor Regulation
 United States Department of Energy

For nuclear emergency policy of the United States see

 Emergency management
 Public Health Emergency Preparedness

For nuclear waste policy see 

 Low-level radioactive waste policy of the United States
 Radioactive waste
 Resource Conservation and Recovery Act
 Yucca Mountain nuclear waste repository

See also
 Classification of radioactive waste
 Low-level waste
 Mixed waste (radioactive/hazardous)
 Spent nuclear fuel
 High-level waste

For international nuclear policy of the US see 

 Nuclear fuel bank

See also 
 Environmental policy
 Environmental policy of the United States
 Food irradiation
 Food and Drug Administration
 National Environmental Policy Act
 Nuclear energy policy by country
 Nuclear power debate
 Nuclear power phase-out
 Nuclear weapons testing#Nuclear testing by country
 United States and weapons of mass destruction

United States federal policy